Pic de Jallouvre is a mountain of Haute-Savoie, France. It is the highest mountain in the Bornes Massif range of the French Prealps and its highest point, the Pointe Blanche, has an elevation of 2438 metres.

References

Mountains of Haute-Savoie
Mountains of the Alps